
Gmina Siepraw is a rural gmina (administrative district) in Myślenice County, Lesser Poland Voivodeship, in southern Poland.

Villages
Gmina Siepraw contains the villages and settlements of Czechówka, Łyczanka, Siepraw and Zakliczyn.

Neighbouring gminas
Gmina Siepraw is bordered by the gminas of Dobczyce, Mogilany, Myślenice, Świątniki Górne and Wieliczka.

References
 Polish official population figures 2006

Siepraw
Myślenice County